The 2022 United States House of Representatives election in Guam was held on Tuesday, November 8, 2022, to elect the non-voting Delegate to the United States House of Representatives from Guam's at-large congressional district. The election coincided with the elections of other federal and state offices, including the larger 2022 United States House of Representatives elections and the 2022 Guamanian legislative election.

The non-voting delegate is elected for a two-year term. Incumbent Delegate Michael San Nicolas, who was re-elected with 59.6% of the vote in 2020, is retiring to run for governor. 

James Moylan, a member of the Guam Legislature, won the election, becoming the first Republican delegate elected in Guam since 1993.

Democratic primary

Candidates

Nominee
Judith Won Pat, former Speaker of the Guam Legislature

Eliminated in Primary 

 Telena Cruz Nelson, Majority Leader of the Guam Legislature

Declined
Michael San Nicolas, incumbent delegate (running for governor)

Results

Republican primary

Candidates

Nominee
James Moylan, member and former minority leader of the Guam Legislature

Results

General election

Results

Notes

References

2022
Guam
United States House of Representatives